Tiba Elturki is a Syrian village located in Salamiyah Subdistrict in Salamiyah District, Hama.  According to the Syria Central Bureau of Statistics (CBS), Tiba Elturki had a population of 361 in the 2004 census. The village name is a reflection of the ethnic identity of the vicinity and its residents are predominantly ethnic Syrian Turkmens.

References 

Populated places in Salamiyah District
Villages in Syria
Turkmen communities in Syria